Keston M. Sutherland is a British poet, and Professor of Poetics at the University of Sussex. He was the editor of the poetics and critical theory journal QUID and is co-editor (with Andrea Brady) of Barque Press. His poetry has been compared to J. H. Prynne, John Wilkinson, and Drew Milne. His poem Hot White Andy was first published in the United States in a special issue of Chicago Review.

References

External links
'A radical poet in the age of Google and Guantánamo' by Nicholas Niarchos
'Mandarin ducks and chee-chee chokes' by John Wilkinson (on Hot White Andy)
Review of Stress Position by Peter Manson
'Unanswerable questions' by Joe Luna (on Stress Position)
Review of The Stats on Infinity by Adam Piette
'The Poetry of Destroyed Experience' by Mathew Abbott (on The Odes to TL61P)
Review of Poetical Works 1999-2015 by Adam Piette
'Poetry in crisis' by Ed Luker (on Poetical Works 1999-2015)
Review of Poetical Works 1999-2015 by Julian Murphet
Review of Whither Russia by Ian Patterson

British literary critics
British poets
Harvard University people
Living people
Alumni of the University of Cambridge
1976 births
British male poets